The 2009/10 FIS Freestyle Skiing World Cup was the thirty first World Cup season in freestyle skiing organised by International Ski Federation. The season started on 12 December 2009 and lasted until 18 March 2010. This season included three disciplines: moguls, aerials and ski cross. There were no halfpipe and dual moguls events this season on calendar.

Men

Moguls

Ski Cross

Aerials

Women

Moguls

Ski Cross

Aerials

Men's standings

Overall 

 Standings after 27 races.

Moguls 

 Standings after 10 races.

Aerials 

 Standings after 6 races.

Ski Cross 

 Standings after 11 races.

Women's standings

Overall 

 Standings after 28 races.

Moguls 

 Standings after 11 races.

Aerials 

 Standings after 6 races.

Ski Cross 

 Standings after 11 races.

Nations Cup

Overall 

Standings after 55 races.

Men 

Standings after 27 races.

Women 

Standings after 28 races.

Footnotes

References

FIS Freestyle Skiing World Cup
2009 in freestyle skiing
2010 in freestyle skiing